Hui'an maidens or Hui'an women are a Han Chinese subgroup that are a part of a distinct Han community residing in Hui'an County of Quanzhou, Fujian, China. They have a distinct dress and marital customs that have been the focus of both anthropologists and governmental censure.

History
The Hui'an are categorized as Han Chinese as they speak Sinitic languages, adopted Han culture, and practise Chinese religions but their origin traces back to the ancient Minyue people of more than two thousand years ago. The isolation on the eastern peninsula of Hui'an prevented Hui'an maidens from completely assimilating into the Han culture, so many of their distinctive customs and traditions still survive today. Other Baiyue peoples who continue to retain a cultural distinction from the Han despite adopting many of their practises and now speak a Sinitic language include the Tanka people and Pinghua.

Culture

Costumes 

Typical Hui'an maidens wear short cyan jackets and skintight black hiphuggers which flare out at the legs and they cover their heads with colorful scarves and conical hats.

Marriage 
Hui'an maidens have very distinct customs regarding their marriage. Newlyweds are not allowed to stay together on their wedding night, so the groom stays in a friend's house. On the second day, the bride pays respects to the groom's family and gives gifts to the elders. On the third day, the groom's sister leads the bride to the communal well to draw two buckets of water. After five days of obeying various customs, she returns to her parents' home. The bride and groom are forbidden to live together or even talk to each other until the bride bears a child. Younger generations no longer practice these customs.

Religion
The majority of the Hui'an people have the same religious practices as other Han Chinese.

References

Bibliography

External links 

 Hui'an Women
 Beauty of Hui'an women
 Hui'an Women's Clothing
 Hui'an women's dance practice

Ethnic groups in China
Han Chinese